The 156th New York State Legislature, consisting of the New York State Senate and the New York State Assembly, met from January 4 to October 19, 1933, during the first year of Herbert H. Lehman's governorship, in Albany.

Background
Under the provisions of the New York Constitution of 1894, re-apportioned in 1917, 51 Senators and 150 assemblymen were elected in single-seat districts; senators for a two-year term, assemblymen for a one-year term. The senatorial districts consisted either of one or more entire counties; or a contiguous area within a single county. The counties which were divided into more than one senatorial district were New York (nine districts), Kings (eight), Bronx (three), Erie (three), Monroe (two), Queens (two) and Westchester (two). The Assembly districts were made up of contiguous area, all within the same county.

At this time there were two major political parties: the Democratic Party and the Republican Party. The Socialist Party, the Communist Party and the Socialist Labor Party also nominated tickets. The Prohibition Party adopted at this time the name Law Preservation Party: to emphasize that Prohibition should be preserved while encountering rampant opposition to it. They endorsed the "dry" Republicans and nominated own candidates in many districts where "wet" Republicans were running.

Elections
The New York state election, 1932, was held on November 8. Governor Franklin D. Roosevelt was elected U.S. President; Lieutenant Governor Herbert H. Lehman was elected Governor; and M. William Bray was elected Lieutenant Governor; all three Democrats. Of the other six statewide elective offices, five were carried by Democrats and one by a Republican judge with Democratic endorsement. The approximate party strength at this election, as expressed by the vote for Governor, was: Democrats 2,660,000; Republicans 1,812,000; Socialists 103,000; Law Preservation 83,000; Communists 26,000; and Socialist Labor 7,000.

Assemblywoman Rhoda Fox Graves (Rep.), of Gouverneur, a former school teacher who after her marriage became active in women's organisations and politics, ran for the State Senate in the 34th district, but was defeated in the Republican primary by the incumbent Warren T. Thayer. No women were elected to the 156th Legislature.

Sessions
The Legislature met for the regular session at the State Capitol in Albany on January 4, 1933; and adjourned on April 10.

Joseph A. McGinnies (Rep.) was re-elected Speaker.

John J. Dunnigan (Dem.) was elected Temporary President of the State Senate.

On June 27, a state convention met to ratify the Twenty-first Amendment to the United States Constitution which proposed to repeal Prohibition.

The Legislature met for a special session at the State Capitol in Albany on July 26; and adjourned on August 24.

The Legislature met for another special session at the State Capitol in Albany on October 18; and adjourned on the next day.

State Senate

Districts

Members
The asterisk (*) denotes members of the previous Legislature who continued in office as members of this Legislature. Joseph A. Esquirol and Samuel Mandelbaum changed from the Assembly to the Senate.

Note: For brevity, the chairmanships omit the words "...the Committee on (the)..."

Employees
 Clerk: Patrick H. O'Connell,  died on June 22, 1933

State Assembly

Assemblymen

Note: For brevity, the chairmanships omit the words "...the Committee on (the)..."

Employees
 Clerk: Fred W. Hammond

Notes

Sources
 Members of the New York Senate (1930s) at Political Graveyard
 Members of the New York Assembly (1930s) at Political Graveyard
 TWOMEY HEADS FINANCE GROUP in the New York Sun on January 10, 1933
 McGinnies Gives Post To Friend of Macy in the Syracuse Journal, of Syracuse, on January 15, 1934

156
1933 in New York (state)
1933 U.S. legislative sessions